is a Japanese kickboxer, signed with K-1. He is the 2016 K-1 Featherweight Grand Prix runner-up and the former Krush Featherweight champion.

Kickboxing career

Early career
Ozawa made his professional debut in June 2014, at Krush 42, against Kento Ito. The fight ended in a draw. Ozawa then won his next six fights, including a rematch with Kento Ito, before suffering the first professional loss of his career, dropping a majority decision against Hirotaka Asahisa. In his next fight, at Krush 61, Ozawa fought Kento Ito for the third time, with the fight ending in a draw.

Krush title reign
At Krush 63, Ozawa fought Shota Kanbe for the Krush Featherweight title. He beat Kanbe by majority decision. Ozawa then fought the K-1 Super Bantamweight champion Takeru Segawa in February 2016. During the pre-fight stare down, the two fighters came to blows, and had to be separated by the security. Takeru won the fight by unanimous decision. Kaito then returned to Krush, to defend his title against Tatsuya Oiwa at Krush 68. The fight went into an extra round, after which Ozawa won by decision.

Ozawa took part in the 2016 K-1 Featherweight GP. He knocked out Josh Tonna in the quarterfinal, and defeated Elias Mahmoudi by unanimous decision in the semifinal, but lost to Takeru Segawa by unanimous decision in the final bout.

He successfully defended the Krush title for the second time against Yun Qi, winning by majority decision. Ozawa would then suffer back-to-back losses to Haruma Saikyo, losing both times by unanimous decision. In their second fight, Ozawa lost the Krush title as well.

Post title reign
Ozawa rebounded from this loss with a 49 second knockout of Satomi Yuzuki, before losing to Jorge Varela in the 2018 K-1 Featherweight GP and Ryusei Ashizawa three months later.

During K-1 World GP 2019: K’FESTA 2, Ozawa won a unanimous decision against Hayato. Three months later, he won another unanimous decision, against Takahiro. He was then scheduled to fight Jawsuayai Sor.Dechaphan at K-1: K’Festa 3. Jawasuayai won by TKO, after the ringside doctor stopped the fight at the end of the second round. He lost his next fight to Tatsuki Shinotsuka at K-1: K'Festa 4 Day 1 as well, dropping a split decision.

Ozawa was scheduled to face Yuta Kunieda at K-1 World GP 2021: Yokohamatsuri on September 20, 2021. He won the fight by unanimous decision.

Ozawa was scheduled to face Shuhei Kumura at K-1 World GP 2022 Japan on February 27, 2022. He lost the fight by unanimous decision, with all three judges scoring the bout 30–29 for Kumura.

Ozawa was expected to face Tatsuya Oiwa at K-1 World GP 2023: K'Festa 6 on March 12, 2023. Ozawa withdrew from the fight on March 8, due to a bone contusion of a metacarpal bone, and was replaced by Yuta Kuneida.

Titles and accomplishments

Professional

 2016 K-1 World GP −57.5 kg World Tournament Runner-up
 2016 Krush Featherweight Champion

Kickboxing record

|- style="background:#fbb"
| 2022-02-27||Loss ||align=left| Shuhei Kumura ||  K-1 World GP 2022 Japan || Tokyo, Japan || Decision (Unanimous) || 3 || 3:00

|-  style="background:#CCFFCC;"
| 2021-09-20 ||Win||align=left| Yuta Kunieda || K-1 World GP 2021: Yokohamatsuri || Yokohama, Japan || Decision (Unanimous) || 3 || 3:00
|-  style="background:#fbb;"
| 2021-03-21|| Loss || align=left| Tatsuki Shinotsuka || K-1: K'Festa 4 Day 1 || Tokyo, Japan || Ext.R Decision (Split)|| 4||3:00
|-  style="background:#fbb;"
| 2020-03-22|| Loss ||align=left| Jawsuayai Sor.Dechaphan || K-1: K’Festa 3 || Saitama, Japan || TKO (Doctor Stoppage) || 2||3:00
|-  style="background:#CCFFCC;"
| 2019-06-03|| Win||align=left| Takahiro || K-1 World GP 2019: Super Bantamweight World Tournament || Osaka, Japan || Decision (Unanimous)|| 3 || 3:00
|-  style="background:#CCFFCC;"
| 2019-03-10|| Win||align=left| Hayato || K-1 World GP 2019: K’FESTA 2|| Saitama, Japan || Ext.R Decision || 4 || 3:00
|-  style="background:#FFBBBB;"
| 2018-09-24|| Loss ||align=left| Ryusei Ashizawa || K-1 World GP 2018: inaugural Cruiserweight Championship Tournament || Saitama, Japan || Decision (Unanimous)|| 3 || 3:00
|-  style="background:#FFBBBB;"
| 2018-06-17|| Loss ||align=left| Jorge Varela || K-1 World GP 2018 -57.5 kg World Tournament, Quarter Final || Tokyo, Japan || TKO (2 Knockdowns) || 1 || 2:57
|-  style="background:#CCFFCC;"
| 2018-02-12|| Win||align=left| Satomi Yuzuki|| Krush.85 || Tokyo, Japan || KO (Left Middle Kick) || 1 || 0:49
|-  style="background:#FFBBBB;"
| 2017-10-01|| Loss||align=left| Haruma Saikyo || Krush.81 || Japan || Decision (Unanimous)|| 3 || 3:00
|-
! style=background:white colspan=9 |
|-  style="background:#FFBBBB;"
| 2017-06-18|| Loss||align=left|  Haruma Saikyo ||K-1 World GP 2017 Super Middleweight Championship Tournament || Japan || Decision (Unanimous)|| 3 || 3:00
|-  style="background:#CCFFCC;"
| 2017-03-03|| Win||align=left| Yun Qi || Krush.74 || Tokyo, Japan || Decision (Majority)|| 3 || 3:00
|-
! style=background:white colspan=9 |
|-  style="background:#FFBBBB;"
| 2016-11-03|| Loss||align=left| Takeru || K-1 World GP 2016 Featherweight World Tournament, Final || Tokyo, Japan || Decision (Unanimous)|| 3 || 3:00
|-
! style=background:white colspan=9 |
|-  style="background:#CCFFCC;"
| 2016-11-03|| Win ||align=left| Elias Mahmoudi || K-1 World GP 2016 Featherweight World Tournament, Semi Final || Tokyo, Japan || Decision (Unanimous)|| 3 || 3:00
|-  style="background:#CCFFCC;"
| 2016-11-03|| Win ||align=left| Josh Tonna || K-1 World GP 2016 Featherweight World Tournament, Quarter Final || Tokyo, Japan || KO (Knee to the body)|| 1 || 0:57
|-  style="background:#CCFFCC;"
| 2016-08-20|| Win||align=left| Tatsuya Oiwa || Krush.68 ～in NAGOYA～  || Nagoya, Japan || Ext.R Decision (Unanimous) || 4 || 3:00
|-
! style=background:white colspan=9 |
|-  
|-  bgcolor="#FFBBBB"
| 2016-06-24 || Loss|| align=left| Takeru  || K-1 World GP 2016 -65kg World Tournament || Tokyo, Japan || Decision (Unanimous) || 3 || 3:00
|-  style="background:#CCFFCC;"
| 2016-02-05|| Win ||align=left| Shota Kanbe || Krush.63  || Tokyo, Japan || Decision (Majority) || 3 || 3:00
|-
! style=background:white colspan=9 |
|-  style="background:#c5d2ea;"
| 2015-12-04|| Draw||align=left| Kento Ito || Krush.61  || Tokyo, Japan || Decision || 3 || 3:00
|-  style="background:#FFBBBB;"
| 2015-10-04|| Loss||align=left| Hirotaka Asahisa || Krush.59  || Tokyo, Japan || Decision (Majority) || 3 || 3:00
|-  style="background:#CCFFCC;"
| 2015-08-14|| Win ||align=left| Kyohei Hayashi || Krush.56  || Tokyo, Japan || KO (Flying Knee) || 1 || 1:48
|-  style="background:#CCFFCC;"
| 2015-05-04|| Win ||align=left| Shoya Masumoto || Krush.54  || Tokyo, Japan || KO (Right Cross)|| 3 || 0:40
|-  style="background:#CCFFCC;"
| 2015-03-14|| Win ||align=left| Hikaru Fujihashi || Krush.52  || Tokyo, Japan || Decision (Unanimous) || 3 || 3:00
|-  style="background:#CCFFCC;"
| 2015-12-21|| Win ||align=left| Ryota || Krush.48 ～in SENDAI～ || Sendai, Japan || KO (Right Hook)|| 2 || 0:36
|-  style="background:#cfc;"
| 2014-11-03|| Win ||align=left| Kento Ito || K-1 World GP 2014 -65kg Championship Tournament || Japan || TKO (3 Knockdowns) || 2 || 1:52
|-  style="background:#CCFFCC;"
| 2014-09-15|| Win ||align=left| Masashi Yamakawa|| Krush-EX 2014 vol.5  || Tokyo, Japan || KO || 1 || 2:30
|-  style="background:#c5d2ea;"
| 2014-06-12|| Draw ||align=left| Kento Ito || Krush.42  || Tokyo, Japan || Decision || 3 || 3:00
|-
| colspan=9 | Legend:

See also
 List of male kickboxers

References

Living people
1993 births
Japanese male kickboxers
Flyweight kickboxers
Sportspeople from Fukushima Prefecture